Arthroclianthus is a genus of flowering plants in the legume family, Fabaceae. It belongs to the subfamily Faboideae. Its c. 19 species are all endemic to New Caledonia. Its closest relatives include Nephrodesmus, also endemic to New Caledonia, Ohwia and Hanslia.

References 

Desmodieae
Endemic flora of New Caledonia
Taxa named by Henri Ernest Baillon
Fabaceae genera